George Gomori may refer to:

 György Gömöri (1904–1957), Hungarian-American physician and histochemist
 George Gomori (writer) (born 1934), Hungarian-born poet, writer and academic